The Bay of Plenty District Health Board (Bay of Plenty DHB or BOPDHB) was a district health board with the focus on providing healthcare to the Bay of Plenty area of New Zealand. In 2022, the Bay of Plenty DHB was dissolved as part of a national overhaul of the district health board system. Its former functions and responsibilities were assumed by Te Whatu Ora (Health New Zealand).

History
The Bay of Plenty District Health Board, like most other district health boards, came into effect on 1 January 2001 established by the New Zealand Public Health and Disability Act 2000.

On 1 July 2022, the Bay of Plenty DHB was dissolved, with Te Whatu Ora (Health New Zealand) assuming responsibility for its hospitals and health services. Its former functions and operations were taken over by Te Whatu Ora's Te Manawa Taki division.

Geographic area
The area covered by the Bay of Plenty District Health Board was defined in Schedule 1 of the New Zealand Public Health and Disability Act 2000 and based on territorial authority and ward boundaries as constituted as at 1 January 2001. The area initially identified was Tauranga District, Western Bay of Plenty District, Whakatane District, Kawerau District, and Ōpōtiki District. The area could be adjusted through an Order in Council, which happened on 27 April 2001, by clause 7 of the Health (Constituencies of District Health Boards) Order 2001, when Mayor Island / Tuhua and Motiti Island were added to the area.

Governance
The initial board was fully appointed. From the 2001 local elections, the board was partially elected (seven members) and in addition, up to four members were appointed by the Minister of Health. The minister also appointed the chairperson and deputy-chair from the pool of eleven board members.

Chairperson
The following table gives a list of chairpersons of Bay of Plenty District Health Board:

Demographics

Bay of Plenty DHB served a population of 240,183 at the 2018 New Zealand census, an increase of 34,188 people (16.6%) since the 2013 census, and an increase of 45,252 people (23.2%) since the 2006 census. There were 87,105 households. There were 117,069 males and 123,111 females, giving a sex ratio of 0.95 males per female. The median age was 41.3 years (compared with 37.4 years nationally), with 48,942 people (20.4%) aged under 15 years, 40,413 (16.8%) aged 15 to 29, 103,791 (43.2%) aged 30 to 64, and 47,034 (19.6%) aged 65 or older.

Ethnicities were 76.8% European/Pākehā, 25.7% Māori, 3.0% Pacific peoples, 6.4% Asian, and 1.8% other ethnicities. People may identify with more than one ethnicity.

The percentage of people born overseas was 18.8, compared with 27.1% nationally.

Although some people objected to giving their religion, 50.1% had no religion, 34.3% were Christian, 0.9% were Hindu, 0.2% were Muslim, 0.5% were Buddhist and 6.9% had other religions.

Of those at least 15 years old, 33,576 (17.6%) people had a bachelor or higher degree, and 36,312 (19.0%) people had no formal qualifications. The median income was $29,500, compared with $31,800 nationally. 28,698 people (15.0%) earned over $70,000 compared to 17.2% nationally. The employment status of those at least 15 was that 88,737 (46.4%) people were employed full-time, 29,433 (15.4%) were part-time, and 7,626 (4.0%) were unemployed.

Hospitals

Public hospitals

 Tauranga Hospital in Tauranga South, Tauranga has 360 beds and provides psychogeriatric, geriatric, mental health, children's health, maternity, surgical and medical services.
 Whakatāne Hospital in Whakatāne, Whakatane District has 96 beds and provides maternity, surgical, medical, mental health and children's health services.

In addition to the public hospitals the Bay of Plenty District Health Board Funds:
 The Te Kaha Medical Centre
 The Opotiki Health Centre (partial funding partnership)

Private hospitals

 Bethlehem Birthing Centre in Bethlehem, Tauranga has 12 beds and provides maternity services.
 Grace Hospital in Pyes Pa, Tauranga has 51 beds and provides surgical services.
 Waipuna Hospice in Te Puna, Tauranga has 12 beds and provides medical services.

Footnotes

Notes

References

District health boards in New Zealand
Bay of Plenty Region
2001 establishments in New Zealand
2022 disestablishments in New Zealand